Cook Memorial Library may refer to:

Cook Memorial Public Library District, northern Lake County, Illinois
Cook Memorial Library (Libertyville, Illinois), listed on the National Register of Historic Places in Lake County, Illinois
Cook Memorial Library (Davenport, Iowa), NRHP-nominated
Cook Memorial Library (Tamworth, New Hampshire), listed on the National Register of Historic Places listings in Carroll County, New Hampshire

See also
Clarissa C. Cook Library/Blue Ribbon News Building, Davenport, Iowa, listed on the NRHP in Scott County, Iowa